Inverness Citadel Football Club was a football team from Inverness, Scotland. Formed in 1883, they were members of the Highland Football League from 1893 to 1935, before closing down in 1937.

Despite the club's demise, the Citadel name has since returned to Inverness, with an amateur team using the name since 2010.

History
Inverness Citadel was formed in the mid-1880s and were initial members of the Highland Football League when it was formed in 1893. Their traditional colours were maroon shirts with white shorts and maroon socks and their home ground was at Shore Street Park. They were league champions on only one occasion, in 1909, although they regularly participated in the North Caledonian Football League as well, winning it five times. The side became the first Highland League side to defeat a Scottish Football League side in the Scottish Cup when in the 1921–22 season they beat Clackmannan 5–3 in the first round.

Citadel withdrew from the Highland League in 1935 due to financial problems, but initially attempted to continue in football. The club committee, however, voted to wind up the club in 1937 due to "the apathy of the supporters".
The team's colours were maroon and white.

References

Defunct football clubs in Scotland
Association football clubs disestablished in 1937
Former Highland Football League teams
Former North Caledonian Football League teams
1883 establishments in Scotland
1937 disestablishments in Scotland
Football clubs in Inverness